Králíky is a municipality and village in Hradec Králové District in the Hradec Králové Region of the Czech Republic. It has about 400 inhabitants.

Administrative parts

Village of Chmelovice, Podoliby and Řehoty are administrative parts of Králíky.

Geography
It lies in a flat agricultural landscape of the East Elbe Table. The Králický brook flows through the municipality.

History
The first written mention of Králíky is from 1635, when it was called Kralice. The village was established in the 16th century, but was devastated. In 1654, it was formed by 13 cottages. It was restored in 1686 when it was acquired by Břevnov Monastery and resettled by Germans.

Řehoty could have been established in the 11th or 12th century. The first written mention of Řehoty is from 1549, when it was sold by the Pernštejn family to the town of Nový Bydžov. In 1623, the village was desolate and the land was annexed to Prasek. In 1786, three families came and founded a new settlement.

The first written mention of Podoliby is from 1363. There were only two homesteads and nine cottages until 1654. It belonged to Havel Zvířetický of Wartenberg who sold the town of Nový Bydžov, including the attached villages, to Vilém II of Pernštejn. Later it was in possession of Kryštof Erazim Sommerfeld, who sold Podoliby in 1623 to Albrecht von Wallenstein. The village was destroyed during the Thirty Years' War, but it did not cease to exist. It expanded again in the 18th century and a school was built there in 1882.

Chmelovice was founded in 1786. Four years later, there were already 11 houses. In 1835 there lived 93 inhabitants.

Chmelovice and Podoliby were separate municipalities until 1961, when they were joined to Králíky. Řehoty was a part of Prasek until 1980, since 1 March 1980 it has been a part of Králíky.

Demographics

Sights
The most valuable monument is the former manor house in Podoliby.

References

External links

Villages in Hradec Králové District